The Wilyakali or Wiljaali are an Australian aboriginal tribal group of the Darling River basin in Far West New South Wales, Australia. Their traditional lands centred on the towns of Broken Hill and Silverton and surrounding country. Today the Wilyakali ancestors  of Broken Hill are still living within Broken Hill and surrounding areas the lack of information on this tribe is far and few as they have been declared extinct or critically endangered.

Etymology of the name Wilyakali
Etymologically the word kali appears to be an archaic term meaning 'people' and is incorporated in numerous tribal names of the Darling River valley, including Paakantyi (Creek People),Bula-ali (Hill people) and Thangkakali. In this construction the name would mean the Wilya people.

Wilyakali language
The Wilyakali language is part of the Paakantyi subgroup family.

The language is considered to be largely extinct from the 1930s with only 23 speakers.

Country

Wilyakali traditional lands covered an estimated  from the Barrier Ranges westwards to Olary in South Australia. They encompassed Silverton, Mutooroo and Boolcoomata. To the northwest they reached Mootwingee, and northeast to just south of Sturt Meadows. The tribe apparently moved south in the first half of the 19th century from its earlier domain to resist strong-arm cultural pressures from the Ngadjuri to adopt circumcision. The Malyangapa lived on their northern tribal borders, while the Yadliyawara were to their west.

Traditional culture
Traditional Wilyakali adopted many cultural influences from people to their north and west, such as mura stories before they had vanished with no acknowledgement from the federal or state governments during the era of the removal of indigenous children from their native lands. According to A. P. Elkin, its kinship system terms bore some overlap with those of the Wadikali.

History

Arrival of Europeans
The ethnographer A. W. Howitt that the Wiljakali tribe that was declared extinct during the early 1900s but is believed to have died out before acknowledgement by the federal government at the time in 1913–1915. Belonged to a distinct supra-tribal group he called the Itchumundi nation that is believed to have become extinct in the early 1800s after the arrival of the British Royal Navy Captain James T Cook as they had Brought uncontrollable disease the like of which native indigenous Australians had never seen before while inhabiting Australian for 60,000 plus year's.

Land corporation
In the 1980s, the people formed the Wilyakali Aboriginal Corporation. This corporation today runs Poolamacca Station and has also gone on to negotiate mining deals, and Native Title Land Claims

Mutawintji National Park

The Wilyakali, are also joint managers of the Mutawintji National Park which is the first national park handed back to the believed traditional owners in NSW but due to the Wilyakali people being declared extinct they are believed to have handed the land back to the original tribes distant ancestors or believed ancestors this area is disputed by three other tribes that are critically endangered .

Areas of cultural significance

Traditional places of cultural significance include Mutawintji gullies.

Alternative names
 Bo-arli, Bulali ('Hill people', from bula, hill
 Wiljagali
 Wiljakali
 Wiljali
 Willoo

Source:

Notes

Citations

Sources

Aboriginal peoples of New South Wales
Aboriginal peoples of South Australia